Zebrzydowice  is a village in the administrative district of Gmina Kalwaria Zebrzydowska, within Wadowice County, Lesser Poland Voivodeship, in southern Poland.

The village has a population of 4,300.

References

Zebrzydowice